CFFB may refer to:

 CFFB (AM), a radio station (1230 AM) licensed to Iqaluit, Nunavut, Canada
 CFFB-TV, a former television station (channel 8) licensed to Iqaluit, Nunavut, Canada